KZAM (98.7 FM) is a radio station licensed to Pleasant Valley, Texas. The station airs a Regional Mexican format.

External links

Regional Mexican radio stations in the United States
ZAM (FM)
ZAM (FM)